The Bethel Regional High School shooting was a school shooting that occurred on February 19, 1997, at Bethel Regional High School in Bethel, Alaska. Two people were killed and two people were wounded by 16-year-old student Evan Ramsey. Ramsey is serving two 99-year prison sentences and will be eligible for parole in 2066 when he is 85.

Prior events
Reports say in the two weeks prior to the incident, more than 15 students knew of Ramsey's intention to commit a school shooting, and two actually assisted him. One student, named James Randall, taught him how to load and fire a shotgun. Another student, named Matthew Charles, told him of the infamy that would come. Reports say that several students brought cameras to school on the day of the shooting, and that many students were watching the shooting from a library balcony overlooking the student commons area.

Shooting
On February 19, 1997, Ramsey armed himself with a Mossberg 500 12-gauge shotgun, and arrived at Bethel Regional High School by school bus. He approached the student commons area, brandishing the shotgun, and shot 15-year-old Josh Palacios in the abdomen. Palacios later died after emergency surgery. He then shot and injured two other students. Reyne Athanas, an art teacher, entered the commons area after hearing the gunshots. Athanas said she tried and failed to convince Ramsey to surrender. He then entered the main lobby, where he shot principal Ron Edwards twice, killing him. 

Ramsey then retreated to the commons area, shooting once at police. An officer returned fire, but Ramsey was uninjured. Ramsey later placed the shotgun barrel under his chin, but then reportedly said, "I don't want to die," laid the shotgun on the ground, and surrendered without further incident.

Motives
Ramsey was believed to be frequently bullied at school. According to his friends, Ramsey complained of being harassed and teased by other students, who he claimed only addressed him as "Screech", a character from the NBC TV series Saved by the Bell. In addition to being picked on by peers, Ramsey had a long history of abuse. His mother lived with a series of violent men who abused Ramsey and his brothers. He also was physically and sexually abused by an older boy in one of his foster homes.

Perpetrator

Evan Ramsey was born February 8, 1981, to Don and Carol Ramsey.
When he was five years old, his father was imprisoned for 10 years after a police standoff and his mother became an alcoholic. Ramsey and his family soon after were forced to relocate to the Anchorage area after their house was set on fire. When he was seven, the Anchorage Department of Youth and Family Services removed Ramsey and his two brothers from his mother's custody and placed them in foster care. He was soon separated from his older brother, and lived in eleven different foster homes in the 3 years between 1988 and 1991. Ramsey and his younger brother were allegedly abused by several foster parents. His younger brother claimed that their foster brothers would pay other children to beat Ramsey for their amusement.

At age 10, Ramsey and his brothers settled in Bethel, Alaska, with their foster mother, who later became their legal guardian.
Ramsey suffered from depression since early childhood, and attempted suicide when he was 10 years old.

Family
Ramsey was not the first in his family to take a firearm into a public place. In October 1986, his father, Don Ramsey, went to the Anchorage Times newspaper office armed with an Armalite AR-18 rifle, a revolver, and more than 210 rounds of ammunition. While inside the building, Don Ramsey began taking hostages and was involved in a brief standoff with police until he surrendered. His motive was that he was angered that the Times refused to publish a political letter he had written. He was sentenced to 10 years in prison, and was paroled several weeks before his son perpetrated the school shooting. 

A week before the school shooting, Ramsey's older brother was arrested for armed robbery.

Aftermath
Following his arrest, Ramsey claimed he did not understand his actions would kill anyone. His trial was delayed as prosecutors discussed whether Ramsey should be tried as a juvenile or as an adult. Prosecutors decided to try Ramsey as an adult in Anchorage. On December 2, 1998, Ramsey was found guilty of two counts of first-degree murder, three counts of first-degree attempted murder, and fifteen counts of third-degree assault. Judge Mark Isaac Wood sentenced him to 210 years in prison. On appeal, his sentence was reduced to two 99-year prison sentences. He was initially imprisoned at the Spring Creek Correctional Center in Seward before being moved to the Wildwood Correctional Complex around 2017. He will be eligible for parole in 2066, when he is 85 years old.

On February 15, 2006, Ramsey participated in an interview with Anderson Cooper titled In the Mind of a Killer, in which his father Don Ramsey blamed the video game Doom for the shooting. His crime was also profiled on the Court TV series Anatomy of a Crime. Ramsey's actions were also covered in the program Kids Who Kill which also featured interviews with Ramsey.

See also 
List of school shootings in the United States (before 2000)

References

External links
 Violence goes to School
 Young lives at risk
 Court case of Evan E. Ramsey 
 Portrait Of A High School Killer

1997 in Alaska
1997 murders in the United States
1997 mass shootings in the United States
Mass shootings in the United States
Attacks in the United States in 1997
Bethel, Alaska
Crimes in Alaska
Deaths by firearm in Alaska
February 1997 events in the United States
Mass shootings in Alaska
Murder in Alaska
School killings in the United States
High school shootings in the United States
School shootings committed by pupils